Code Black may refer to:

Code Black (emergency code), a hospital emergency code denoting a threat to personnel, or a suspicious object or bomb threat
Code Black, 1997 album by Jimmy Pursey
Code Black (DJ), Australian DJ and music producer
Code Black (TV series), a 2015–2018 American television series
CodeBlack Entertainment, American entertainment conglomerate founded and run by an African-American entrepreneur Jeff Clanagan
 Code Black (documentary), 2013 documentary film

See also
Black Code (disambiguation)
Condition Black, a state of mind